James Washington "Sunny Jim" Pastorius (July 12, 1881 in Pittsburgh, Pennsylvania – May 10, 1941 in Pittsburgh, Pennsylvania) was a pitcher in Major League Baseball. He pitched from 1906–1909 for the Brooklyn Superbas.

External links

 

1881 births
1941 deaths
Baseball players from Pittsburgh
Major League Baseball pitchers
Brooklyn Superbas players
Albany Senators players